Mathoor Krishnamurthy was a Kannada writer and former Director of the Bharatiya Vidya Bhavan, Bangalore.  He was also instrumental in establishing the Bharatiya Vidya Bhavan in London. He was a Padma Shri awardee. He died on 6 October 2011 at the age of 82.

References

Kannada-language writers
Bharatiya Vidya Bhavan
2011 deaths
Year of birth missing